The 1999–2000 season, was the Guildford Flames' eighth year of ice hockey. The Guildford Flames competed in the British National League.

The season saw the Flames get their first-ever taste of foreign opposition, with the visit of Manitoba Bison to the Guildford Spectrum on Wednesday 15 December 1999, one of four matches on their UK tour.

Player statistics

Netminders

Schedule And Results

Benson & Hedges Cup
The big surprise of the 1999 Benson & Hedges Cup was the failure of the defending Plate holders, Guildford Flames, to get past the first round of the Cup. Unfortunately for Stan Marple's team, they were drawn into the difficult Group C which produced the eventual Plate finalists, Basingstoke Bison and Slough Jets. That said, Flames were the only BNL team to beat the Bison, 5-1, on the first weekend of the season, a contest best remembered for Bison turning up without their strip and a mass brawl in the final minute.

British National League

British National League Final Standings

British National League play-offs
The top eight BNL teams qualified for the playoffs. In the quarter-finals the teams were split into two groups of four with the teams finishing 1st, 4th, 5th and 8th in the league going into Group A and the others into Group B. Teams tied on points in the quarter-final group stages were separated first by wins in normal time, then by away wins in normal time. The two top teams in each group qualified for the semi-finals with the winner of one group playing a best-of-three series against the runner-up in the other group. Home ice advantage went to the top team in each group. The winning semi-finalists competed for the title in a best-of-five finals series, with the home ice advantage going to the team that finished highest in the league.

Quarter-final Group A

Quarter-final Group B

NTL: Christmas Cup
The third Christmas Cup campaign was open to the ten British National League clubs and played on a knockout basis over the Christmas and New Year period. The draw for the quarter-finals was based on the league's final standings in 1998/1999 with first playing eighth, second playing seventh and so on. The last placed sides, Edinburgh Capitals and Paisley Pirates, first played off against league newcomers, Milton Keynes Kings and Solihull Blaze, for the right to enter the competition proper. The Cup was sponsored by telecoms and cable TV company, ntl:, the league's new partner.

References

External links
Official Guildford Flames website

Guildford Flames seasons
1999–2000 in English ice hockey